Marshal of the Royal Thai Air Force Fuen Ronnaphagrad Ritthakhanee (21 February 1900 – 8 July 1987) was a Royal Thai Air Force officer who served as the Commander of the Royal Thai Air Force from 1949 to 1957. In July 1951, Ritthakhanee became Minister of Transport and in 1955 he was elevated to the position of Deputy Prime Minister of Thailand.  Relinquishing the Deputy Prime Ministership in 1957, he briefly served as Minister of Health that year.

In 1947 he was one of the group of senior officers who planned and carried out the Siamese coup d'état.

On 13 December 1949 Fuen Ronnaphagrad Ritthakhanee took over as Commander of the Royal Thai Air Force, replacing Air Marshal Luang Tevaritpunluok. He continued in the Air Force's senior post until 1957.

In 1953, Air Chief Marshal Fuen Ronnaphagrad Ritthakhanee founded the Royal Thai Air Force Academy, albeit on a temporary basis.  Four years later in 1957, Fuen Ronnaphagrad Ritthakhanee who was by then a marshal of the Royal Thai Air Force and its Commander, returned to the Academy laying its foundation stone during a ceremony which marked its permanent establishment.

In the 1960s Fuen Ronnaphagrad Ritthakhanee was the chairman of the United Flour Mill Public Company Limited, Thailand's  first wheat flour mill.  Fuen was retired at the Supreme Command Headquarters in 1961. He died on 8 July 1987, at the age of 87.

References

|-

Fuen Ronnaphagrad Ritthakhanee
1900 births
1987 deaths
Fuen Ronnaphagrad Ritthakhanee
Fuen Ronnaphagrad Ritthakhanee

Fuen Ronnaphagrad Ritthakhanee
Fuen Ronnaphagrad Ritthakhanee
Fuen Ronnaphagrad Ritthakhanee